Montmélian is a commune in the Savoie department in the Auvergne-Rhône-Alpes region in south-eastern France. Montmélian station has rail connections to Grenoble, Modane, Bourg-Saint-Maurice and Chambéry.

Geography

Climate

Montmélian has a humid subtropical climate (Köppen climate classification Cfa) closely bordering on a oceanic climate (Cfb).

Population

See also
Communes of the Savoie department

References

External links

 Official site

Communes of Savoie